P. A. College of Engineering (P.A.C.E) is an engineering college located in Karnataka, India. It is situated at Konaje, 25 km from Mangalore. P.A.C.E was founded in 1999 by the Kerala-based businessman Dr. P.A. Ibrahim Haji. Approximately 1,450 engineering students graduate each year.

About
The main building on the 60-acre campus was designed by Upalker Sadekar architects of Mumbai. The college was established with a sanctioned intake of 240 students per academic year; 60 students in each of four disciplines: Electronics and Communication, Telecommunications, Computer Science, and Information Science. Since then, three additional disciplines have been added - Mechanical Engineering, Biotechnology, and Civil Engineering. With these additions, the student intake per academic year doubled to 480 students.

The Electronics and Communication, Biotechnology, Chemistry and Computer Science departments each have dedicated research centers.

The trust continued its venture of establishing and running successful educational institutions. A Pre-University College was opened in the academic year 2005-06 with Science & Commerce streams having a combined student strength of 350. One of the factors of establishing this college was to have a feeder institution to the already established institution.

The latest venture of the Trust is P.A. Polytechnic, which was established in 2006. P.A. Polytechnic offers Diploma education in Electronics & Communication, Electrical & Electronics, Civil Engineering, Computer Science & Engineering. In 2009 a Mechanical Engineering branch was added.

The trust also runs hostels to house students. Boys live in one hostel, while girls live in another. Approximately 1,200 students are fed each day.

The Trust has plans of continuing in the path of development turning the institutions into an autonomous and ultimately into a Deemed University.

UG courses 
 B.E in Biotechnology                             (60 Intakes)
 B.E in Civil Engineering                         (120 Intakes)
 B.E in Computer Science and Engineering          (120 Intakes)
 B.E in Electrical Engineering                    (60 Intakes)
 B.E in Electronics and Communication Engineering (120 Intakes)
 B.E in Mechanical Engineering                    (180 Intakes)

PG courses 
 M.Tech in Digital Communication Networks (18 Intakes)
 M.Tech in Computer Science and Engineering (18 Intakes)
 M.Tech in Thermal Engineering (18 Intakes)
 M.Tech in VLSI Design (18 Intakes)
 M.B.A (120 Intakes)

Research programme 
 Bio-Technology
 Chemistry
 Electronics and Communication Engineering
 Computer Science Engineering
 Mechanical Engineering
 Mathematics
 Management Studies

Research collaborations
Institute of Chemistry
 Research Centres: Academia Sinica, Taipei, Taiwan, Republic of China 	
GenØk – Centre for Biosafety
 Research Centres: University of Tromsø, Tromsø, Norway	
University of Sains Malaysia (USM)
 Research Centres: Malaysia 	
	
Staff from different departments in PACE have collaborated with researchers in various Institutes and Universities in India and across the world that resulted in joint publications. Examples of such Institutes and Universities are Curtin University of Technology, Perth, Western Australia and BRAC University.

Research clusters
 Drug Discovery (Synthesis and Biological Studies) 	
 VLSI Design and Fuzzy Logic 	
 High Performance Computing and Embedded Systems 	
 Computational Fluid Dynamics 	
 Flow in Jet and Turbo Jet Engines 	
 Biotechnology

Professional society chapters
 ISTE Student Chapter 	
 CSI Student Chapter 	
 IEEE Student Chapter 	
 Linux Users Group (LUG)

Awards and certifications
P.A.C.E. is approved by the All India Council for Technical Education (AICTE). It is affiliated with the Visvesvaraya Technological University (VTU). The National Board of Accreditation (NBA) accredited the college in 2009. Several research grants have been awarded to the Department of Chemistry. P.A.C.E. has also been certified to the ISO 9001-2008.

References

External links
 

Engineering colleges in Mangalore
Affiliates of Visvesvaraya Technological University